The Beautiful Legs of Sabrina is a low-budget 1958 Italian-West German crime-drama-comedy film starring Mamie Van Doren, Antonio Cifariello, and Rossana Martini.

The Beautiful Legs of Sabrina was Mamie Van Doren's first film made away from Hollywood. Van Doren, who had become known as one of "The Three M's" – the other two being Marilyn Monroe and Jayne Mansfield – had signed with Universal Pictures, but stopped accepting roles from them before her contract was up.

Cast
Mamie Van Doren	as Sabrina
Antonio Cifariello as Teo
Rossana Martini	as Toni
Raffaele Pisu as Mario
Enrico Viarisio as Il commendatore

Reception
The Beautiful Legs of Sabrina, was a flop when released and is now largely unknown.

References

External links

1958 films
1958 comedy films
Italian comedy films
West German films
1950s Italian-language films
1950s German-language films
Films directed by Camillo Mastrocinque
1950s multilingual films
German multilingual films
Italian multilingual films
1950s German films
1950s Italian films